Dr. Bernard F. Master (born May 17, 1941) is an internationally recognized conservationist, distinguished health care professional, and business entrepreneur. He received his medical degree from Philadelphia College of Osteopathic Medicine and was in practice for more than 30 years. He is an internationally recognized birder after whom the Chocó vireo (Vireo masteri) was named. Master is among the few Americans to have seen a representative of all extant bird families in the world (248) and has observed more than 8,325 birds in the wild. He is the author of No Finish Line: Discovering the World's Secrets One Bird at a Time.

Biography
Master was born in Philadelphia to Gilbert and Leona Master. His passion for birding started when he was four years old, at the encouragement of his father with whom he'd accompany on bird walks. His family's vacation home in North Wildwood, New Jersey was near Cape May Bird Observatory, a birding mecca and in the path of the largest fall migration in the eastern North America. He graduated from Overbrook High School (Philadelphia) in 1958 and in 1962 earned a Bachelor of Science form Ursinus College. Master graduated from Philadelphia College of Osteopathic Medicine on June 11, 1966, and began his medical career.

In 1968, Master was drafted into the Vietnam War where he served one year as a battalion surgeon in the U.S. Army's 5th Infantry Division (Mechanized) which defended the Vietnamese Demilitarized Zone in northern Quảng Trị province. He spent another year as Post Surgeon for the U.S. Army's Medical Intelligence and Information Agency. Master was awarded a Bronze Star with oak leaf cluster and Combat Medical Badge for his service. 

Following military discharge, Master spent the next 30 years as a primary care physician in Columbus, Ohio. During this time, he founded two successful medical health care businesses. In the 1970s he opened ten MEDCenterTM locations, which provided full-service outpatient services to inner-city residents. In 1985, he founded HealthPower, Inc., a managed care company that provided services to Ohio Medicaid patients. Health Power, Inc. went public in 1994 and he sold the company in 2000. 

Over the course of ten years, Master was appointed by three different Ohio State governors to chair the Ohio Medical Quality Foundation, a group charged with funding state medical programs that improve the lives and health of Ohio residents. He also endowed minority scholarship funds at Heritage College of Osteopathic Medicine at Ohio University, Ohio State University, and Temple University. In recognition of his practice's focus on serving the health needs of Columbus's inner-city families, Master was the 1995 recipient of the Martin Luther King award by the Columbus Education Association, a union force of 5,000 central Ohio teachers. 

During his medical years, Master often watched birds at Green Lawn Cemetery, a popular birding spot in Columbus, Ohio.

After retiring in 2005, Master dedicated his life to birding, wildlife conservation and sponsorships of local events. A tennis aficionado, he has sponsored the Bernard Master Doubles Classic, the oldest continuous-running tennis tournament in Ohio, since 1978. In 2004, he became a founding board member of the Ohio Ornithological Society. He served as vice chair of the Ohio Chapter of The Nature Conservancy for eleven years and was given the chapter's highest award, the Oak Leaf Award, in recognition of the significant contributions he made to the chapter to fulfill its mission. For 16 years, he served on the board of trustees for the Columbus Zoo and Aquarium.  The Zoo unveiled its new Dr. Bernard Master Aviary on May 19, 2021. Master also sponsors the annual Moonlight on the Marsh distinguished lecture series at Florida Gulf Coast University (Naples, Florida) and is a frequent birdwatching guide and speaker at this and other organizations.

In 1994, Master won the right to name a new species of vireo (Passeriformes: Vireonidae) from the Western Andes of Colombia. The Chocó vireo was first observed on August 25, 1991, by Paul Salaman in western Nariño in southwest Colombia and later collected by ornithologist Gary Stiles. The discoverers decided to auction the rights to the bird's name in order to raise money for habitat conservation. Master won the bid, and his donation was used to create the Río Nambí Community Natural Reserve.. He named the species Vireo masteri.

Master's contributions to world bird conservation were honored by the late HRH Prince Bernhard of the Netherlands (aka Prince Bernhard of Lippe-Biesterfeld), who helped found the World Wide Fund for Nature.

In 2015, Master published his autobiography entitled No Finish Line: Discovering the World's Secrets One Bird at a Time. In it, Master documents his world birding adventures and pays homage to his colleagues and experiences in Vietnam.

References

External links 

Ohio Ornithological Society
Cape May Bird Observatory

1941 births
Living people
Birdwatchers
Ornithology
American conservationists
United States Army personnel of the Vietnam War
United States Army Medical Corps officers